Hasund is a surname. Notable people with the surname include:

 Geir Hasund (born 1971), Norwegian footballer, son of Kjetil
 Kjetil Hasund (born 1942), Norwegian footballer
 Sigvald Hasund (1868–1959), Norwegian academic and politician
 Vilde Hasund (born 1997), Norwegian footballer 

Norwegian-language surnames